Renous-Quarryville (2020 population: 1188) is a Canadian local service district in Northumberland County, New Brunswick. It is located 25 mi upstream of Miramichi, and is situated where the Renous River, and the Indiantown brook. discharges into the Southwest Miramichi River. It is named for the Renous river, and settlement, as well as Quarryville's quarry, hence the name "Renous-Quarryville local service district."

Renous proper, and the river is probably named for a Micmac chief, Sock Renou.

Renous-Quarryville is 5 kilometres east of Blackville where the majority of students attend school, although many also attend Millerton school.

The community is the site of the Atlantic Institution, a Correctional Service of Canada maximum-security prison located on the site of a former Canadian Forces ammunition depot.

On March 30, 2019, the Tom Donovan Arena in Renous was named 2019 winner of the Kraft Hockeyville national contest, with a $250,000 prize for arena upgrades and an NHL pre-season game to be played in the area on September 18, 2019. On that date, the Montreal Canadiens faced the Florida Panthers. Said game had taken place in the city of Bathurst, about an hour away.

History

Notable people

See also
List of communities in New Brunswick

References

Communities in Northumberland County, New Brunswick
Designated places in New Brunswick
Local service districts of Northumberland County, New Brunswick
Mining communities in New Brunswick